200 South Wacker Drive is a high-rise office building located in Chicago, Illinois. Construction of the building began in 1979 and was completed in 1981. Harry Weese Associates designed the building, which has 41 stories and stands at a height of 500 ft (152m), making it the 92nd tallest building in Chicago.

See also
List of tallest buildings in Chicago

References

Skyscraper office buildings in Chicago
Office buildings completed in 1981
1981 establishments in Illinois